The Pingat Gagah Perkasa is a medal instituted in 1962. It is awarded to any person in Singapore that has performed "an act of conspicuous gallantry and courage in circumstances of extreme personal danger". It may also be awarded to any person who has performed an act outside Singapore in special circumstances.

The military equivalent of the award is the Pingat Gagah Perkasa (Tentera), which is given to members of the Singapore Armed Forces.

History
The Pingat Gagah Perkasa was instituted on 19 April 1962. It was one of six state awards to be given out by Yusof Ishak, the then President of Singapore, during the 1962 Singapore National Day Honours. The rules of the award were revised in July 1996.

Recipients

References

External links
Prime Minister's Office Singapore - The Conspicuous Gallantry Medal

Civil awards and decorations of Singapore
Courage awards